Sunny Nook is a rural locality in the South Burnett Region, Queensland, Australia. In the  Sunny Nook had a population of 23 people.

History 
Sunny Nook State School opened on 1 September 1927 and closed in 1945.

In the  Sunny Nook had a population of 23 people.

References 

South Burnett Region
Localities in Queensland